228 (two hundred [and] twenty-eight) is the natural number following 227 and preceding 229.

In mathematics 

228 is a refactorable number
and a practical number.
There are 228 matchings in a ladder graph with five rungs.
228 is the smallest even number n such that the numerator of the nth Bernoulli number is divisible by a nontrivial square number that is relatively prime to n.

The binary form of 228 contains all the two digit binary numbers in sequence from highest to lowest (11 10 01 00).

References

Integers